Alice Kundert (July 23, 1920 – June 10, 2013) was an American politician.

From Mound City, South Dakota, she went to Northern State University and taught school. Kundert served as Auditor of the State of South Dakota 1969 to 1978 as a Republican. She then served as Secretary of State of South Dakota 1979 to 1986. Kundert then ran for Governor of South Dakota and lost the election. Kundert then served in the South Dakota House of Representatives 1991–1994. She also served in various offices in Campbell County, South Dakota. Her father Otto Kundert and her brother Gust Kundert also served in the South Dakota House of Representatives.

Notes

1920 births
2013 deaths
People from Campbell County, South Dakota
Northern State University alumni
Women in South Dakota politics
Women state legislators in South Dakota
Republican Party members of the South Dakota House of Representatives
State Auditors of South Dakota
Secretaries of State of South Dakota
20th-century American politicians
20th-century American women politicians
21st-century American women